Tristan Priem (born 12 February 1976) is a former Australian racing cyclist. He finished in second place in the Australian National Road Race Championships in 1997.

References

External links

1976 births
Living people
Australian male cyclists
Cyclists from Victoria (Australia)